The 1981–82 season was the 12th season of the Portland Trail Blazers in the National Basketball Association (NBA).  The Blazers finished 42–40, dropping three games more than in the previous season.

Portland finished eighth in the Western Conference; as only six teams qualified in each conference for the 1982 NBA Playoffs, the Blazers did not participate in the postseason.  This would be the only year the Blazers missed the playoffs between their championship season of 1976–77 and 2002–03.

Draft picks

Note:  This is not a complete list; only the first two rounds are covered, as well as any other picks by the franchise who played at least one NBA game.

Roster

Regular season

Season standings

z - clinched division title
y - clinched division title
x - clinched playoff spot

Record vs. opponents

Game log

Regular season

|- align="center" bgcolor="#ccffcc"
| 1
| October 30
| Phoenix
| W 103–95
|
|
|
| Memorial Coliseum
| 1–0

|- align="center" bgcolor="#ccffcc"
| 2
| November 1
| Seattle
| W 104–94
|
|
|
| Memorial Coliseum
| 2–0
|- align="center" bgcolor="#ccffcc"
| 3
| November 3
| Los Angeles
| W 102–100
|
|
|
| Memorial Coliseum
| 3–0
|- align="center" bgcolor="#ccffcc"
| 4
| November 4
| @ Golden State
| W 109–108
|
|
|
| Oakland–Alameda County Coliseum Arena
| 4–0
|- align="center" bgcolor="#ccffcc"
| 5
| November 6
| Utah
| W 119–109
|
|
|
| Memorial Coliseum
| 5–0
|- align="center" bgcolor="#ccffcc"
| 6
| November 8
| Denver
| W 120–116
|
|
|
| Memorial Coliseum
| 6–0
|- align="center" bgcolor="#ccffcc"
| 7
| November 10
| Dallas
| W 117–95
|
|
|
| Memorial Coliseum
| 7–0
|- align="center" bgcolor="#ffcccc"
| 8
| November 12
| @ San Diego
| L 115–122
|
|
|
| San Diego Sports Arena
| 7–1
|- align="center" bgcolor="#ffcccc"
| 9
| November 13
| @ Los Angeles
| L 115–119
|
|
|
| The Forum
| 7–2
|- align="center" bgcolor="#ffcccc"
| 10
| November 15
| San Antonio
| L 105–110
|
|
|
| Memorial Coliseum
| 7–3
|- align="center" bgcolor="#ccffcc"
| 11
| November 20
| New Jersey
| W 106–86
|
|
|
| Memorial Coliseum
| 8–3
|- align="center" bgcolor="#ffcccc"
| 12
| November 25
| @ Seattle
| L 103–110
|
|
|
| Kingdome
| 8–4
|- align="center" bgcolor="#ccffcc"
| 13
| November 27
| @ Utah
| W 103–93
|
|
|
| Salt Palace Acord Arena
| 9–4
|- align="center" bgcolor="#ccffcc"
| 14
| November 29
| Chicago
| W 114–109
|
|
|
| Memorial Coliseum
| 10–4

|- align="center" bgcolor="#ccffcc"
| 15
| December 1
| @ Denver
| W 121–113
|
|
|
| McNichols Sports Arena
| 11–4
|- align="center" bgcolor="#ccffcc"
| 16
| December 2
| @ Kansas City
| W 112–107
|
|
|
| Kemper Arena
| 12–4
|- align="center" bgcolor="#ffcccc"
| 17
| December 4
| @ San Antonio
| L 111–127
|
|
|
| HemisFair Arena
| 12–5
|- align="center" bgcolor="#ffcccc"
| 18
| December 5
| @ Houston
| L 98–110
|
|
|
| The Summit
| 12–6
|- align="center" bgcolor="#ffcccc"
| 19
| December 8
| Golden State
| L 108–122
|
|
|
| Memorial Coliseum
| 12–7
|- align="center" bgcolor="#ffcccc"
| 20
| December 10
| @ Phoenix
| L 110–117
|
|
|
| Arizona Veterans Memorial Coliseum
| 12–8
|- align="center" bgcolor="#ffcccc"
| 21
| December 11
| @ Los Angeles
| L 116–124
|
|
|
| The Forum
| 12–9
|- align="center" bgcolor="#ccffcc"
| 22
| December 13
| Detroit
| W 105–99
|
|
|
| Memorial Coliseum
| 13–9
|- align="center" bgcolor="#ccffcc"
| 23
| December 15
| San Diego
| W 118–101
|
|
|
| Memorial Coliseum
| 14–9
|- align="center" bgcolor="#ffcccc"
| 24
| December 19
| @ Dallas
| L 95–102
|
|
|
| Reunion Arena
| 14–10
|- align="center" bgcolor="#ffcccc"
| 25
| December 22
| Los Angeles
| L 110–124
|
|
|
| Memorial Coliseum
| 14–11
|- align="center" bgcolor="#ccffcc"
| 26
| December 25
| Seattle
| W 99–94
|
|
|
| Memorial Coliseum
| 15–11
|- align="center" bgcolor="#ccffcc"
| 27
| December 26
| @ San Diego
| W 128–116
|
|
|
| San Diego Sports Arena
| 16–11
|- align="center" bgcolor="#ffcccc"
| 28
| December 30
| @ Phoenix
| L 112–113
|
|
|
| Arizona Veterans Memorial Coliseum
| 16–12

|- align="center" bgcolor="#ffcccc"
| 29
| January 1
| Philadelphia
| L 105–120
|
|
|
| Memorial Coliseum
| 16–13
|- align="center" bgcolor="#ccffcc"
| 30
| January 3
| Kansas City
| W 127–116 (OT)
|
|
|
| Memorial Coliseum
| 17–13
|- align="center" bgcolor="#ccffcc"
| 31
| January 5
| San Antonio
| W 115–110
|
|
|
| Memorial Coliseum
| 18–13
|- align="center" bgcolor="#ffcccc"
| 32
| January 8
| Denver
| L 121–124
|
|
|
| Memorial Coliseum
| 18–14
|- align="center" bgcolor="#ffcccc"
| 33
| January 10
| Houston
| L 109–111
|
|
|
| Memorial Coliseum
| 18–15
|- align="center" bgcolor="#ccffcc"
| 34
| January 12
| Indiana
| W 105–93
|
|
|
| Memorial Coliseum
| 19–15
|- align="center" bgcolor="#ccffcc"
| 35
| January 14
| @ Houston
| W 111–100
|
|
|
| The Summit
| 20–15
|- align="center" bgcolor="#ccffcc"
| 36
| January 16
| @ Dallas
| W 110–103
|
|
|
| Reunion Arena
| 21–15
|- align="center" bgcolor="#ffcccc"
| 37
| January 19
| @ Atlanta
| L 101–112
|
|
|
| The Omni
| 21–16
|- align="center" bgcolor="#ffcccc"
| 38
| January 20
| @ Philadelphia
| L 110–115
|
|
|
| The Spectrum
| 21–17
|- align="center" bgcolor="#ffcccc"
| 39
| January 22
| @ Washington
| L 97–110
|
|
|
| Capital Centre
| 21–18
|- align="center" bgcolor="#ccffcc"
| 40
| January 24
| @ Boston
| W 123–119
|
|
|
| Boston Garden
| 22–18
|- align="center" bgcolor="#ccffcc"
| 41
| January 28
| San Diego
| W 96–93
|
|
|
| Memorial Coliseum
| 23–18

|- align="center" bgcolor="#ccffcc"
| 42
| February 2
| Kansas City
| W 102–97
|
|
|
| Memorial Coliseum
| 24–18
|- align="center" bgcolor="#ffcccc"
| 43
| February 3
| @ Utah
| L 118–122
|
|
|
| Salt Palace Acord Arena
| 24–19
|- align="center" bgcolor="#ccffcc"
| 44
| February 5
| Utah
| W 121–100
|
|
|
| Memorial Coliseum
| 25–19
|- align="center" bgcolor="#ccffcc"
| 45
| February 7
| New York
| W 100–98
|
|
|
| Memorial Coliseum
| 26–19
|- align="center" bgcolor="#ccffcc"
| 46
| February 10
| @ Cleveland
| W 105–91
|
|
|
| Richfield Coliseum
| 27–19
|- align="center" bgcolor="#ffcccc"
| 47
| February 11
| @ Milwaukee
| L 105–116
|
|
|
| MECCA Arena
| 27–20
|- align="center" bgcolor="#ccffcc"
| 48
| February 13
| @ Detroit
| W 128–120
|
|
|
| Pontiac Silverdome
| 28–20
|- align="center" bgcolor="#ffcccc"
| 49
| February 14
| @ Indiana
| L 91–107
|
|
|
| Market Square Arena
| 28–21
|- align="center" bgcolor="#ffcccc"
| 50
| February 16
| Washington
| L 97–100
|
|
|
| Memorial Coliseum
| 28–22
|- align="center" bgcolor="#ffcccc"
| 51
| February 19
| Boston
| L 117–127
|
|
|
| Memorial Coliseum
| 28–23
|- align="center" bgcolor="#ffcccc"
| 52
| February 21
| Atlanta
| L 97–109
|
|
|
| Memorial Coliseum
| 28–24
|- align="center" bgcolor="#ffcccc"
| 53
| February 23
| @ Chicago
| L 122–123
|
|
|
| Chicago Stadium
| 28–25
|- align="center" bgcolor="#ccffcc"
| 54
| February 24
| @ Kansas City
| W 123–111
|
|
|
| Kemper Arena
| 29–25
|- align="center" bgcolor="#ffcccc"
| 55
| February 26
| @ New Jersey
| L 106–110
|
|
|
| Brendan Byrne Arena
| 29–26
|- align="center" bgcolor="#ffcccc"
| 56
| February 27
| @ New York
| L 105–107
|
|
|
| Madison Square Garden
| 29–27

|- align="center" bgcolor="#ccffcc"
| 57
| March 2
| Phoenix
| W 119–108 (OT)
|
|
|
| Memorial Coliseum
| 30–27
|- align="center" bgcolor="#ffcccc"
| 58
| March 5
| Cleveland
| L 110–111
|
|
|
| Memorial Coliseum
| 30–28
|- align="center" bgcolor="#ccffcc"
| 59
| March 7
| @ Golden State
| W 106–102
|
|
|
| Oakland–Alameda County Coliseum Arena
| 31–28
|- align="center" bgcolor="#ffcccc"
| 60
| March 10
| @ Dallas
| L 102–104
|
|
|
| Reunion Arena
| 31–29
|- align="center" bgcolor="#ccffcc"
| 61
| March 12
| @ San Antonio
| W 112–108
|
|
|
| HemisFair Arena
| 32–29
|- align="center" bgcolor="#ffcccc"
| 62
| March 13
| @ Houston
| L 107–112
|
|
|
| The Summit
| 32–30
|- align="center" bgcolor="#ffcccc"
| 63
| March 16
| Los Angeles
| L 108–120
|
|
|
| Memorial Coliseum
| 32–31
|- align="center" bgcolor="#ccffcc"
| 64
| March 18
| Golden State
| W 109–95
|
|
|
| Memorial Coliseum
| 33–31
|- align="center" bgcolor="#ccffcc"
| 65
| March 19
| @ Utah
| W 131–129 (OT)
|
|
|
| Salt Palace Acord Arena
| 34–31
|- align="center" bgcolor="#ccffcc"
| 66
| March 21
| Dallas
| W 109–101
|
|
|
| Memorial Coliseum
| 35–31
|- align="center" bgcolor="#ffcccc"
| 67
| March 23
| Milwaukee
| L 104–109
|
|
|
| Memorial Coliseum
| 35–32
|- align="center" bgcolor="#ffcccc"
| 68
| March 25
| Houston
| L 95–108
|
|
|
| Memorial Coliseum
| 35–33
|- align="center" bgcolor="#ffcccc"
| 69
| March 26
| @ Golden State
| L 89–102
|
|
|
| Oakland–Alameda County Coliseum Arena
| 35–34
|- align="center" bgcolor="#ffcccc"
| 70
| March 28
| @ Seattle
| L 101–109
|
|
|
| Kingdome
| 35–35
|- align="center" bgcolor="#ccffcc"
| 71
| March 30
| Kansas City
| W 109–99
|
|
|
| Memorial Coliseum
| 36–35

|- align="center" bgcolor="#ccffcc"
| 72
| April 1
| San Antonio
| W 109–105
|
|
|
| Memorial Coliseum
| 37–35
|- align="center" bgcolor="#ffcccc"
| 73
| April 2
| @ Denver
| L 121–127
|
|
|
| McNichols Sports Arena
| 37–36
|- align="center" bgcolor="#ffcccc"
| 74
| April 4
| @ Los Angeles
| L 111–129
|
|
|
| The Forum
| 37–37
|- align="center" bgcolor="#ccffcc"
| 75
| April 6
| Denver
| W 136–122
|
|
|
| Memorial Coliseum
| 38–37
|- align="center" bgcolor="#ccffcc"
| 76
| April 8
| @ Phoenix
| W 106–104
|
|
|
| Arizona Veterans Memorial Coliseum
| 39–37
|- align="center" bgcolor="#ccffcc"
| 77
| April 9
| San Diego
| W 124–104
|
|
|
| Memorial Coliseum
| 40–37
|- align="center" bgcolor="#ccffcc"
| 78
| April 11
| Golden State
| W 116–106 (OT)
|
|
|
| Memorial Coliseum
| 41–37
|- align="center" bgcolor="#ffcccc"
| 79
| April 13
| @ Seattle
| L 86–88
|
|
|
| Kingdome
| 41–38
|- align="center" bgcolor="#ffcccc"
| 80
| April 15
| @ San Diego
| L 123–129
|
|
|
| San Diego Sports Arena
| 41–39
|- align="center" bgcolor="#ffcccc"
| 81
| April 16
| Phoenix
| L 99–113
|
|
|
| Memorial Coliseum
| 41–40
|- align="center" bgcolor="#ccffcc"
| 82
| April 18
| Seattle
| W 119–114
|
|
|
| Memorial Coliseum
| 42–40

Player statistics

References

Portland Trail Blazers seasons
Portland Trail Blazers 1981
Portland Trail Blazers 1981
Po
Portland
Portland